The 2019 NASCAR K&N Pro Series East was the 33rd season of the K&N Pro Series East, a regional stock car racing series sanctioned by NASCAR. It began with the New Smyrna 175 at New Smyrna Speedway on February 11 and concluded with the General Tire 125 at Dover International Speedway on October 4. General Tire took over the position as the official tire supplier of the series from Goodyear. Sam Mayer was crowned the series champion, becoming the youngest champion in series history, at 16 years, 3 months, 8 days, topping the previous record set by Todd Gilliland after he won the 2016 title. Tyler Ankrum entered the season as the defending drivers' champion, but he did not defend his championship because he moved up to the Truck Series full time in 2019.

This was the last season of the series before it became an ARCA series in 2020 as part of the unification of the NASCAR K&N Pro Series East and West and the ARCA Menards Series.

Drivers

Notes

Schedule
On December 4, 2018, NASCAR announced the 2019 schedule. Langley and New Jersey were dropped from the schedule in favor a second race at Bristol. All races in the season were televised on NBCSN on a tape delay basis and shown live on FansChoice.tv.

Notes

The race at Thompson Speedway Motorsports Park was originally scheduled for June 15, but was cancelled on June 4 and was not replaced.

Results and standings

Races

1 – The qualifying session for the New Smyrna 175 was cancelled due to weather. The starting lineup was decided by practice results.
2 – Starting grid was set by the fastest lap times from the first WhosYourDriver.org Twin 100 race.

Drivers' championship

(key) Bold – Pole position awarded by time. Italics – Pole position set by final practice results or Owners' points. * – Most laps led.

Notes
1 – Chuck Buchanan Jr. and Mason Diaz received championship points, despite the fact that they did not start the race.
2 – Sam Mayer was unable to complete the last 80 laps after the rain delay due to prior commitments. Kyle Benjamin substituted for Mayer.
3 – Rubén García Jr. was unable to complete the last 80 laps after the rain delay due to a conflict with a PEAK Mexico Series race. Colin Garrett substituted for García Jr., after he crashed out his No. 18 entry on lap thirteen.
4 – Hailie Deegan was unable to complete the last 80 laps after the rain delay due to family reasons. Nobody substituted for her.

See also

2019 Monster Energy NASCAR Cup Series
2019 NASCAR Xfinity Series
2019 NASCAR Gander Outdoors Truck Series
2019 ARCA Menards Series
2019 NASCAR K&N Pro Series West
2019 NASCAR Whelen Modified Tour
2019 NASCAR Pinty's Series
2019 NASCAR PEAK Mexico Series
2019 NASCAR Whelen Euro Series

References

External links

NASCAR KandN Pro Series East